Xiao Yang or Yang Xiao may refer to:

People surnamed Xiao
Xiao Yang (governor) (1929–1998), Chinese politician, governor of Sichuan
Xiao Yang (judge) (1939–2019), President of the Supreme Court of China
Yang Xiao (scientist) (born  1967), Chinese-born computer scientist at the University of Alabama
Xiao Yang (director) (born 1980), Chinese actor-director, a member of the duo Chopstick Brothers
Sonny Xiao or Xiao Yang, vice-president of Nenking Group

People surnamed Yang
Yang Xiao (rower) (born 1964), Chinese rower
Yang Xiao (Jin Yong character), a character from The Heaven Sword and Dragon Saber